Kodialbail is a locality in the city of Mangalore in Karnataka state of India. It is located 2 km to the north of Hampankatta. It is home to some of the most prestigious educational institutes of Mangalore as well as the Mangalore Stock Exchange.

Education
 Besant Institutions
 Besant Evening College
 Besant National Girl's High School
 Canara Institutions
 Canara College
 Canara Pre-University College
 Sharada Institutions
 Sharada Vidyalaya (Affiliated to CBSE)
 Sharada Pre-University College
 St. Aloysius ITI
 SDM College of Law & Business Management

Friend's Club
 KodialBail Friend's 
Sarvajanika Satyanarayana Pooja Samiti Kodial-Bail
Sarvajanika Ganeshotsava Samiti Kodial-Bail 2002-present

Healthcare

 Yenepoya Hospital
 Densure Dental Clinic

Business
 TMA Pai International Convention Centre
 Mangalore Stock Exchange

Leisure
 City Center Mall (1 km towards Hampankatta)
 Empire Mall
 The Ocean Pearl
 Sagar Ratna

Other Places
 Bench Court
 District jail

References

External links
 Canara Institutions Website
 Besant Institutions Website
 Sharada Institutions Website
 KodialBail Friends

Localities in Mangalore